Yoshua Shing (born 20 June 1993 in Port Vila) is a Vanuatuan table tennis player. He competed at the 2012 Summer Olympics and 2016 Summer Olympics in the men's singles, but was defeated in the preliminary round in both competitions. He was the flagbearer for Vanuatu at the 2016 opening ceremony. He competed at the 2020 Summer Olympics, in Men's singles.

He competed in the 2018 Commonwealth Games.

In 2020, he participated in Pacific Unite: Saving Lives Together.

References

External links
 

Vanuatuan male table tennis players
1993 births
Living people
People from Port Vila
Olympic table tennis players of Vanuatu
Table tennis players at the 2012 Summer Olympics
Commonwealth Games competitors for Vanuatu
Table tennis players at the 2014 Commonwealth Games
Table tennis players at the 2016 Summer Olympics
Table tennis players at the 2020 Summer Olympics